Evangeline is an 1847 epic poem by Henry Wadsworth Longfellow.

Evangeline may also refer to:

People
 Evangeline (given name)

Places
 Evangeline Parish, Louisiana
 Evangeline Township, Michigan
 Evangeline, Louisiana, an unincorporated community in Acadia Parish, Louisiana
 Evangeline, Gloucester County, New Brunswick, a Canadian community

Music

Albums
 Evangeline (Emmylou Harris album)
 Evangeline (Gary Lucas album), 1996
 Evangeline (Mary Anne Hobbs compilation)
 Evangeline (Ulf Lundell album)

Songs
 "Evangeline", a song written by Robbie Robertson and performed by The Band with Emmylou Harris from The Last Waltz, and by Harris with Dolly Parton and Linda Ronstadt on Harris's album Evangeline
 "Evangeline", a song by Los Lobos from their album How Will the Wolf Survive?, also performed by the Jerry Garcia Band on their eponymous double live album
 "Evangeline" (song), a single by Cocteau Twins
 "Evangeline", a song from the Matthew Sweet album Girlfriend based on the comic book character
 "Evangeline", a song from Bad Religion from the album The Process of Belief
 "Evangeline", a song from Raffi's 1977 album Adult Entertainment
 "Evangeline", a 1987 single by The Icicle Works
 "Evangeline", the first single from Chad Brock's 1999 debut album; also recorded by Sammy Kershaw on his 2006 album Honky Tonk Boots
 "Evangeline", a song from Max Raptor's 2013 album Mother's Ruin
 "Evangeline", a song from Angels of Light's 2001 album How I Loved You
 "Evangeline", a single from The Mission's 2001 album Aura

Musicals and opera
 Evangeline (1874 musical), an 1874 musical with music by Edward E. Rice, the first American production billed as musical comedy
 Evangeline, a 1946 West End musical by George Posford and Harry Jacobson
 Evangeline (1999 musical), a 1998 Canadian musical by Jamie Wax and Paul Taranto
 Evangeline, a 2014 Canadian opera, composed by Colin Doroschuk of the band Men Without Hats

Other
 Evangeline (band), a 1990s country-pop band
 Evangeline Records, a US record company

Film
 Evangeline (1913 film), a 1913 Canadian drama film
 Evangeline (1919 film), a 1919 silent film
 Evangeline (1929 film), a 1929 silent film
 Evangeline (2013 film), a 2013 Canadian supernatural thriller film

Other
 Evangeline (comics), a 1980s comic book
 Evangeline (train), a former passenger train in Nova Scotia operated by Via Rail